Braintree railway station is the northern terminus of the Braintree Branch Line in the East of England, serving the town of Braintree, Essex.

Its three-letter station code is BTR. The platform has an operational length for twelve-coach trains. The station is currently managed by Greater Anglia, which also operates all trains serving it.

History

There have been two stations at Braintree. The first, which was the northern terminus of the Maldon, Witham & Braintree Railway, opened on 2 October 1848. That station was closed to passengers with the opening of the Bishop's Stortford, Dunmow & Braintree Railway on 22 February 1869, when the old terminus was replaced by a through-station on the new line. It continued as a goods depot until 1964. The new station was named Braintree & Bocking on 19 October 1910, but reverted to its original name of Braintree between 1948 and 1953. The station once featured in many model railway sets as "Braintree & Bocking" was the printed station name in the Airfix railway accessories. Passenger services on the route between Braintree and Bishop's Stortford ceased on 3 March 1952.

Services
On Sundays, services terminate at Witham and passengers travelling on towards London must change for a connecting train.

Services are typically formed with Class 321 and Class 720 electric multiple units.

References

Further reading

External links 

Historical Pictures of Braintree Station

Railway stations in Essex
DfT Category C2 stations
Former Great Eastern Railway stations
Railway stations in Great Britain opened in 1848
Railway stations in Great Britain closed in 1869
Railway stations in Great Britain opened in 1869
Greater Anglia franchise railway stations
1869 establishments in England
Braintree, Essex